Secondatia is a genus of plants in the family Apocynaceae first described as a genus in 1844. It is native to Jamaica and South America.

Species
 Secondatia densiflora A.DC. - Brazil, 3 Guianas, Venezuela, Colombia, Ecuador, Peru, Bolivia, Paraguay 
 Secondatia duckei Markgr. - SE Colombia, NW Brazil
 Secondatia floribunda A.DC. - Brazil
 Secondatia macnabii (Urb.) Woodson - Jamaica
 Secondatia schlimiana Müll.Arg - S Colombia, N Brazil

formerly placed in this genus
 Secondatia arborea (Vell.) Müll.Arg. = Malouetia arborea (Vell.) Miers
 Secondatia difformis (Walter) Benth. & Hook.f. = Thyrsanthella difformis (Walter) Pichon
 Secondatia ferruginea (A.Rich.) Miers = Angadenia berteroi (A.DC.) Miers
 Secondatia stans (A.Gray) Standl. = Mandevilla foliosa (Müll.Arg.) Hemsl.

References

Odontadenieae
Apocynaceae genera